Nandapuram is a village in Suryapet district of the Indian state of Telangana. It is located in Thirumalagiri mandal.

References 

Villages in Nalgonda district